Cyber Group Studios is a Paris-based developer, producer and distributor of animated television series and movies for children in France and internationally. The company produces 3D and 2D animation products for television series and movies, web series, and news and documentaries. It also licenses its own and third-party characters.

History
Cyber Group Animation was founded in 2004. The company changed its name to Cyber Group Studios in March 2009.

Cyber Group in 2016 acquired Pictor Media. In January 2017, the company launched Cyber Group Studios USA, a subsidiary located at the Culver Studios in Culver City, California under president and CEO Richard Goldsmith. In September 2017, the L-GAM investment company bought out the company's minority investors.

On March 1, 2018, Cyber Group hired Thierry Braille, formerly VP and MD at Disney Interactive EMEA, as head of its new interactive division. In November 2018, Cyber Group Studios opened in Roubaix, France an animation studio.

On January 25, 2022, Cyber Group Studios acquired UK-based production company A Productions. On February 8, 2022, Cyber Group Studios acquired Italian animation studio Graphilm Entertainment.

On June 13, 2022, Cyber Group Studios announced they had formed a new joint-venture with Splash Entertainment to form CyberSplash Entertainment.

Animated television series 
Some are adaptations, while others are licensed from other countries.
 50/50 Heroes
 Adam's Bakery
 Animalia
 Balloopo
 The Bellflower Bunnies                                                                                                                     
 Underdogs United          
 Bambalayé
 Blondes
 Cloud Bread
 Cotoons
 Calimero
 Crime Time 
 Dragon Striker
 Fish 'n' Chips
 Farmkids
 Final Fantasy IX (upcoming)
 G-Fighters
 Gigantosaurus
 Grenadine and Peppermint
 Guess What?
  Insatiable
 The Happos Family
 Iqbal: Tales of a Fearless Child
 The Last Kids on Earth
 Leo the Wildlife Ranger
 The Long Long Holiday
 Mademoiselle Zazie
 Manon
 Menino and the Children of the World
 Mia
 Mini Ninjas
 Mirette Investigates
 My Goldfish Is Evil
 Nina Patalo
 Orange Moocow
 Ozie Boo!
 Patch Pillows
 The Pirates Next Door (fr)
 Pom Pom and Friends
 Press Start!
 Raju the Rickshaw
 Sadie Sparks
 Squared Zebra
 The Space Commanders
 Taffy (fr)
 Tales of Tatonka
 Zak Jinks (fr)
 Zorro: The Chronicles
 Zou
Droners
 Tom Sawyer

References

2022 mergers and acquisitions

French animation studios
French companies established in 2004
Mass media companies established in 2004
Companies based in Paris